Ebaeus is a genus of beetles belonging to the family Melyridae.

Species:
 Ebaeus abietinus Abeille 1869
 Ebaeus appendiculatus Erichson 1840
 Ebaeus ater Kiesenwetter 1863

References

Melyridae
Cleroidea genera